The County of Gorizia, from 1365 Princely County of Gorizia, was a State of the Holy Roman Empire. Originally mediate Vogts of the Patriarchs of Aquileia, the Counts of Gorizia (Meinhardiner) ruled over several fiefs in the area of Lienz and in the Friuli region of northeastern Italy with their residence at Gorizia (Görz).

In 1253 the Counts of Gorizia inherited the County of Tyrol, from 1271 onwards ruled by the Gorizia-Tyrol branch which became extinct in the male line in 1335. The younger line ruled the comital lands of Gorizia and Lienz until its extinction in 1500, whereafter the estates were finally acquired by the Austrian House of Habsburg.

History

Gorizia (House of Meinhardin)
Count Meinhard I, a descendant of the Meinhardiner noble family with possessions around Lienz in the Duchy of Bavaria, is mentioned as early as 1107. As a vogt official of the Patriarchs of Aquileia, he was enfeoffed with large estates in the former March of Friuli, including the town of Gorizia, and from 1127 on called himself a Graf von Görz.

The borders of the county changed frequently in the following four centuries, due to frequent wars with Aquileia and other counties, but also to the subdivision of the territory in two main nuclei: one around the Bavarian ancestral seat of Lienz on the upper Drava River up to Innichen in the Puster Valley, the other centered on Gorizia in Friuli itself.

Gorizia-Tyrol (House of Meinhardin)
Meinhard's descendant Count Meinhard III of Gorizia, a follower of the Hohenstaufen emperor Frederick II, upon the extinction of the ducal House of Babenberg was appointed administrator of Styria in 1248. He campaigned the adjacent Duchy of Carinthia but was defeated by the troops of Duke Bernhard von Spanheim and his son Archbishop Philip of Salzburg at Greifenburg in 1252. Nevertheless, the county reached the apex of its power, when Meinhard III inherited County of Tyrol (as Meinhard I) from his father-in-law Count Albert IV one year later.

After Count Meinhard III had died in 1258, his sons at first ruled jointly until in 1271 they divided their heritage: While the elder Meinhard IV took the comital Tyrolean lands west of the Puster Valley, his brother Albert retained the Meinhardiner ancestral lands around Lienz and Gorizia. After his death, the County of Gorizia was again partitioned among his sons into the "inner county" at Gorizia, ruled by Henry III, and the "outer county" around Lienz und Albert II. When Count Henry III was assassinated in 1323, the Gorizia lands were shattered into four countries. The Counts of Gorizia temporarily controlled the Italian March of Treviso (Marca Trevigiana) and the remains of the Istrian march around Pazin (Mitterburg), which Count Albert III of Görz bequeathed to the House of Habsburg in 1365.

In 1365 Count Meinhard VI of Görz was granted the princely title by the Luxembourg emperor Charles IV, the county was thereon called Gefürstete Grafschaft Görz. The Meinhardiner nevertheless suffered a steep decline under their powerful neighbours, the Austrian lands of the Habsburg dynasty and the Republic of Venice.

Gorizia (House of Meinhardin)
After the Habsburgs had acquired the Carinthian duchy with the March of Carniola in 1335 and the County of Tyrol in 1363, the remaining Gorizia lands of Lienz were a thorn in their side, separating the dynasty's "hereditary lands". Venice had conquered the former Patriarchate territories in Friuli, which were incorporated into the Domini di Terraferma by 1434. The Council of Ten strived for the adjacent "inner county" lands around Gorizia up to the Venetian Stato da Màr territories in Istria. Due to the pressure, the Gorizia counts took their residence at Bruck Castle in Lienz.

In 1429 the county was reunited under the single rule of Count Henry VI. His son, the last count Leonhard, died in 1500 and despite claims raised by Venice, according to a contract of inheritance and the active support of the Gorizia governor Virgil von Graben the county fell to the Habsburg emperor Maximilian I.

Habsburg

While the Lienz area was administrated with the Tyrolean crown land, the "inner county" of Gorizia remained an Imperial State of the Holy Roman Empire ruled by the Inner Austrian Archdukes as part of the Austrian Circle, governed by a capitano. Its territory included the Isonzo Valley down to Aquileia, the area of Cormons and Duino, and the former Venetian fortress of Gradisca, which was conquered by Imperial troops in 1511. Monfalcone formed a Venetian exclave in the county from 1420 to 1797. In 1647 Emperor Ferdinand III separated the "Principality of Gradisca" from Gorizia for his courtier Johann Anton von Eggenberg, until in 1747 both were again merged to form the Princely County of Gorizia and Gradisca, a crown land of the Habsburg monarchy.

Counts

Houses of Eppenstein and Siegharding
Marquard (E) (fl. 1060/1074), Vogt of Aquileia
Meginhard (S) (died about 1090), from the House of Siegharding, Count in the Puster Valley
Henry I (E) (died after 1102), Vogt of Aquileia from 1082
Ulrich (E) (died 1122), brother

House of Gorizia

Line extinct, county inherited by the Habsburg king Maximilian I, Archduke of Austria.

See also
House of Gorizia
History of Gorizia
Austrian Empire
History of Slovenia

Notes

References

External links

 
Gorizia
1120s establishments in the Holy Roman Empire
1127 establishments in Europe
1747 disestablishments in the Holy Roman Empire
States and territories established in 1127
Gorizia
Geography of Friuli-Venezia Giulia
Geographical, historical and cultural regions of Italy
House of Gorizia
History of Friuli-Venezia Giulia

de:Grafschaft Görz